Edward Rudolph Bradley Jr. (June 22, 1941 – November 9, 2006) was an American broadcast journalist and news anchor. He was best known for his reporting on 60 Minutes and CBS News.

Bradley began his journalism career as a radio news reporter in Philadelphia, where his first major story was covering the 1964 Philadelphia race riot. He moved to New York City in 1967 and worked for WCBS as a radio news reporter. Four years later, Bradley moved to Paris, France, where he covered the Paris Peace Accords as a stringer for CBS News. In 1972, he transferred to Vietnam and covered the Vietnam War and Cambodian Civil War, coverage for which he won Alfred I. duPont and George Polk awards.

Bradley moved to Washington, D.C. following the wars and covered Jimmy Carter's first presidential campaign. He became the first African American White House correspondent for CBS News, holding the position from 19761978. During this time, Bradley also anchored the Sunday night broadcast of the CBS Evening News, a position he held until 1981.

In 1981, Bradley joined 60 Minutes. While reporting for CBS News and 60 Minutes, he reported on approximately 500 stories and won numerous Peabody and Emmy awards for his work covering a wide range of topics, including the rescue of Vietnamese refugees, segregation in the United States, the AIDS epidemic in Africa, and sexual abuse within the Catholic Church. Bradley died in 2006 of leukemia.

Early life and education
Bradley was born on June 22, 1941, in Philadelphia, Pennsylvania. Bradley's parents divorced when he was young and he was raised in a poor household by his mother, Gladys Gaston Bradley, and spent summers with his father in Detroit. Bradley attended high school at Mount Saint Charles Academy in Rhode Island and Saint Thomas More Catholic Boys School in Philadelphia, graduating from the latter in 1959. He received a Bachelor of Science degree in education from Cheyney State College in 1964. While at Cheyney State, Bradley played offensive tackle for the school's football team.

Career

19641971: Early career
Bradley began his career as a math teacher in Philadelphia in 1964. While working as a teacher, he also worked at WDAS as disc jockey. While working for WDAS, Bradley covered the 1964 Philadelphia race riot and interviewed Martin Luther King Jr. Those experiences led him to pursue a career as a journalist, with Bradley later saying, "I knew that God put me on this earth to be on the radio." Bradley moved to New York City in 1967 to further his career as a reporter, working for WCBS. While at WCBS, Bradley found he was primarily assigned stories most relevant to African American listeners. After confronting his editor about those assignments, Bradley received assignments on a broader array of topics. Bradley left WCBS in 1971.

19711981: Vietnam, White House and CBS Evening News
Bradley moved to Paris, France in 1971. He was fluent in French, and while there was hired by CBS News as a stringer. He transferred to Saigon in 1972 to report on the Vietnam War and Cambodian Civil War, as well as reporting on the Paris Peace Accords. While reporting in Cambodia, Bradley was wounded by a mortar round. After recovering, he returned to Asia to continue reporting on both wars. Bradley was one of the last American journalists to be evacuated in 1975 during the Fall of Saigon. He was awarded Alfred I. duPont and George Polk awards for his coverage in Vietnam and Cambodia.

In 1976, Bradley was assigned to cover Jimmy Carter's 1976 presidential campaign, as well the Republican and Democratic national conventions, covering the latter events until 1996. Following Carter's victory, Bradley became the network's first African American White House correspondent, a position he held from 19761978. Bradley disliked the position at the White House and being tied to the movements of the president. Also in 1976, Bradley began anchoring the Sunday night broadcasts of the CBS Evening News, holding that position until 1981. In 1978, he became one of the principal correspondents for the documentary program CBS Reports, reporting for the program until 1981.

Bradley won the first of 20 News and Documentary Emmy Awards in his career for his 1979 documentary "The Boat People", reporting on Vietnamese refugees escaping the country via boat or ship, at one point wading into the water to assist in the rescue of the refugees. "The Boat People" also earned Bradley an Edward Murrow Award, a duPont citation, and a commendation from the British Academy of Film and Television Arts. The same year, another Bradley documentary, "Blacks in America: With All Deliberate Speed?", aired. The documentary detailed segregation in the United States and how the treatment of African Americans in the U.S. had changed since Brown v. Board of Education. The 2-hour program also won duPont and Emmy awards.

19812006: 60 Minutes

Following Dan Rather's move to the CBS Evening News, Bradley joined the news magazine program 60 Minutes. According to producer Don Hewitt, Bradley's "calm, cool, and collected" reporting style was the right fit for the program. In his first decade on 60 Minutes, Bradley reported numerous high-profile stories in the 1980s on a variety of topics, including with Lena Horne, convicted criminal Jack Henry Abbott, and on schizophrenia. He won Emmys for all three stories.

In 1986, Bradley interviewed singer Liza Minnelli and expressed interest in wearing an earring. Minnelli gave him a diamond stud after the interview, which Bradley began wearing on air. He was the first male reporter to consistently wear an earring on air, "challenging the notions of journalistic propriety," according to Robb Report writer Kristopher Fraser. Bradley repeatedly turned down offers to anchor the CBS Evening News in the late 1980s, preferring instead to continue working on 60 Minutes.

Bradley's reporting in the 1990s included such topics as Chinese forced labor camps, Russian military installations, and the effects of nuclear weapons testing near Semey, Kazakhstan. He also profiled numerous people, including Thomas Quasthoff, Muhammad Ali, and Mike Tyson. He won a series of awards for his reporting that decade, including Emmys, duPont citations, and a Peabody Award. Bradley also anchored CBS's Street Stories from 19921993. In 1995, he was awarded the grand prize Robert F. Kennedy Journalism Award for the CBS Reports documentary "In the Killing Fields of America".

Throughout the 2000s until his death in 2006, Bradley continued to cover a variety of topics, including the AIDS epidemic in Africa, sexual abuse within the Catholic Church, and the 1955 murder of Emmett Till. He also interviewed such people as Bob Dylan and Neil Armstrong, and conducted the only television interview with Timothy McVeigh.

Bradley reported approximately 500 stories for 60 Minutes over his 25-year tenure with the program, more than any other correspondent over the same time period. In 2005, Bradley was awarded a Lifetime Achievement Award by the National Association of Black Journalists.

Illness and death
Bradley was diagnosed with lymphocytic leukemia in his later years, keeping the illness secret from many, including colleagues such as Mike Wallace. His health rapidly declined after contracting an infection, but Bradley continued to work, saying that he preferred to die "with (his) boots on." Bradley filed 20 stories in his final year with 60 minutes, conducting his last interviews with members of the Duke University lacrosse team accused of rape weeks before his death. Bradley died at Mount Sinai Hospital in Manhattan on November 9, 2006, at the age of 65.

Funeral and memorial
More than 2,000 people attended Bradley's funeral service at Riverside Church in New York. Among the attendees were the Reverends Al Sharpton and Jesse Jackson, musicians Jimmy Buffett and Wynton Marsalis, journalists Dan Rather, Walter Cronkite, and Charlayne Hunter-Gault, and former U.S. president Bill Clinton. In April 2007, Bradley was honored with a jazz funeral procession at the New Orleans Jazz & Heritage Festival.

Legacy

Impact of journalism
Morley Safer described the themes of Bradley's reporting as "justice, justice served and justice denied." Bradley's reporting on the AIDS epidemic in Africa has been credited with convincing drug companies to donate and discount drugs to treat the disease. His reporting on psychiatric hospitals in the U.S. prompted federal investigations into the largest chains, and his reporting on the Duke lacrosse team has been credited with ensuring the accused had a fair trial. Bradley was seen as an inspiration for Black Americans, with columnist Clarence Page writing: "Mr. Bradley challenged the system. He worked hard and prepared himself. He opened himself to the world and dared the world to turn him away. He wanted to be a lot, and he succeeded. Thanks to him, the rest of us know that we can too."

Style

Bradley became well-known for his style on air, both for his demeanor and his fashion sense. Often described as "cool" by his colleagues, Bradley's unflappability led to his position on 60 Minutes. His interview style has drawn comparisons to Columbo and been described as "disarming", "confident", and "streetwise." He was noted for his ability to get interview subjects to divulge information on camera with his body language.

Bradley was also known for bucking fashion trends for newscasters. His iconic style included an array of patterns, a short beard, and an earring worn in his left ear. Bradley began wearing the earring during the 1980s during a time when it was uncommon for men in America to do so. Mike Wallace said after Bradley's death that he thought Bradley's decision to wear an earring inspired others to do the same.

Philanthropy and honors
In 1994, Bradley and the Radio Television News Directors Association Foundation started a scholarship program in his name for journalists of color. It awards $10,000 annually. In 2007, he was inducted into the Broadcast Pioneers Hall of Fame by the Broadcast Pioneers of Philadelphia.

Bradley was named one of the "100 Outstanding American Journalists in the last 100 years" in 2012 by faculty at New York University. In 2015, the Pennsylvania State Legislature renamed City Avenue in Philadelphia "Ed Bradley Way." A mural of Bradley was completed in the city in 2018, and a historical marker was installed in 2021.

Personal life
Bradley was fond of jazz and hosted Jazz at Lincoln Center on National Public Radio. He performed with Jimmy Buffett and the Neville Brothers and was referred to as "the fifth Neville brother" by the group. He was an outdoorsman, and often hiked or skied in his free time.

Bradley married three times, to Diane Jefferson, Priscilla Coolidge, and Patricia Blanchet. He split his time between homes in New York and Colorado.

Recognition

See also

 History of African Americans in Philadelphia
 List of Cheyney University of Pennsylvania alumni
 List of people from Philadelphia
 The Interviews: An Oral History of Television
 National Association of Black Journalists Hall of Fame

References

External links

 
 
 
Jazz at Lincoln Center Radio remembers Ed Bradley

1941 births
2006 deaths
American television reporters and correspondents
American war correspondents of the Vietnam War
African-American journalists
African-American television personalities
American male journalists
American radio journalists
CBS News people
60 Minutes correspondents
Journalists from Pennsylvania
Television personalities from Philadelphia
Cheyney University of Pennsylvania alumni
Deaths from cancer in New York (state)
Deaths from lymphocytic leukemia
People from East Hampton (town), New York
20th-century American journalists
21st-century American journalists
Mount Saint Charles Academy alumni
20th-century African-American people
21st-century African-American people